The Third World are the developing countries of Asia, Africa, and Latin America, the nations not aligned with either the First World or the Second World.

Third World may also refer to:

Music
 Third World (band), the Jamaican reggae band formed in 1973
Third World (Third World album), 1976
 The Third World (album), a 1970 album by Gato Barbieri
 The 3rd World (Immortal Technique album) (2008)

Political entities
 Developing countries
 Third World, part of the Maoist Three Worlds Theory Cold War political concept

Video games
Third World, a cancelled video game from Activision

See also 
 Third World Child, a 1987 album by Johnny Clegg
 Third-world feminism or Postcolonial feminism
 Third World Media, an adult film production company
 Third World War (band), an English rock & roll band formed in 1970